Mohammad Taher Vadi (born 10 October 1989, in Mashhad) is an Iranian volleyball player who plays as a setter for the Iranian national team. He has played for national team in several tournaments like 2012, 2014 and 2016 Asian Cup, 2014 FIVB World Championship qualification tournament and 2015 Asian Championship.

Honours

National team
Asian Championship
Silver medal (1): 2015
Asian Games
Gold medal (1): 2018
Asian Cup
Gold medal (1): 2016
Silver medal (1): 2012
Asian U20 Championship
Gold medal (1): 2008

Individual
Best Server: 2012 Asian Cup

References

1989 births
Living people
Iranian men's volleyball players
Sportspeople from Mashhad
Universiade medalists in volleyball
Universiade gold medalists for Iran
Asian Games medalists in volleyball
Volleyball players at the 2018 Asian Games
Medalists at the 2018 Asian Games
Asian Games gold medalists for Iran
Medalists at the 2017 Summer Universiade
Islamic Solidarity Games competitors for Iran